Georgi Chomakov (born 6 April 1959) is a Bulgarian fencer. He competed in the individual and team sabre events at the 1980 Summer Olympics, and the team sabre event at the 1988 Summer Olympics.

In 1984, Chomakov announced that he will not compete in the 1984 Olympics in Los Angeles due to a boycott.

In 1983, he finished third in the European Individual Championships. In 1985 and 1987, he finished second in the World Championships with the Bulgarian sabre team.

He is the father of Margarita Tschomakova, a Bulgarian sabre fencer.

References

External links
 

1959 births
Living people
Olympic fencers of Bulgaria
Fencers at the 1980 Summer Olympics
Fencers at the 1988 Summer Olympics
Sportspeople from Plovdiv
Bulgarian male sabre fencers